Evridiki Theokleous (born 25 February 1968), known professionally as simply Evridiki, is a Greek-Cypriot rock, pop, and electropop singer. She is best known in Europe for representing her home country, Cyprus, in the Eurovision Song Contest in 1992, 1994 and 2007 with the songs Teriazoume, Eimai Anthropos Ki Ego and Comme Ci, Comme Ça, respectively.

Music career

Early years
Born in Limassol, Cyprus, Theokleous was raised in the island's capital, Nicosia. While still at school, she studied music at the National Conservatory of Cyprus. When she finished school, she went to Le Studio des Variétés in Paris, France where she studied music, theatre, and dancing. Afterwards she went to the Berklee College of Music in Boston, US where she supplemented her musical studies with courses of harmony and instrumentation.

In 1989, she moved to Athens, Greece, to work with several artists, sing in compilations, and in 1991, she released her first personal album Gia Proti Fora.

Collaboration with Theofanous 
Their first collaboration was in 1992 with the album Kane pos m agapas. The album did very well in sales and received very high airplay. In 1993, Evridiki released her album Missise Me (Hate Me), making her one of the most successful singers in Greece. Missise Me is supposed to be Evridiki's favourite album among her fans.

In 1994, while wanting to try out something new, she started working on her next album Fthinoporo Gynaikas (Woman's Autumn). Inspired by the idea of her growing older as the time passes, the album was a mixture of pop and Greek folklore music. The same year (1994) she married Giorgos Theofanous. The composer has always considered Evridiki as his muse, even after they got divorced in 2000. Together, they had a son Angelos, who was born in November 1996.

Theofanous was the main composer and producer of Evridiki's first nine albums while he collaborated with Minos-Emi A&r manager Vangelis Yannopoulos in 1998 and 1999. Albums like Dese Mou ta Matia (1998) (her first Golden album), To Koumpi (1999) and Ola Dika Sou (2000), with their pop/laiko sound, are characteristic of Evridiki's Theofanous period.

Career turn – collaboration with Korgialas 
In 2002, Evridiki made a turn in her career. After her divorce she cooperated no more with her ex-husband and turned from pop music to rock/alternative. In her 2002 album Live Ki Allios she performed well known rock songs revealing another side of hers. In 2002, she also performed on stage as "Taptim" in the musical The King and I, produced by Mimi Denisi with very positive acceptance by public and critics.

After having a (studio) music break for almost three years, Evridiki released the album Oso Fevgo Gyrizo (2003), in which she wrote two songs. This record would be a turning point in Evridiki's career by characterising a new era for her. Since then she has been recognised as the most successful Greek female rock singer . She released another critically acclaimed record Sto Idio Vagoni (2005). In both albums she collaborated to musician Dimitris Korgialas

Korgialas was the composer of Comme Ci, Comme Ça (Cyprus' entry at the Eurovision Song Contest 2007). The same year (2007) Evridiki's album "13" (her thirteenth personal album) was released (on 26 March 2007). Later, the same year, she was awarded as the Singer of the Year in Cyprus.

In 2009, Evridiki released the album Etsi Ine I Agapi, performing together with Dimitris Korgialas. The next year (2010) the cd-single Etsi Apla was released.

In 2017, Evridiki collaborated with Lopodites, a local pop-rock band based in Cyprus. The collaboration continued in 2018 when she appeared on stage once again with Lopodites and female singer Georgia Kerala (vocalist of the band Ble) at Ravens Music Hall in Limassol.

Overall, Evridiki is one of the most popular successful and best selling singers in Greece and Cyprus. Besides George Theophanous and Dimitris Korgialas, she has worked with important personalities of the Greek music industry; Vasilis Papakonstantinou, Giorgos Hatzinasios, Yannis Spanos, Marios Tokas, Vangelis Dimitriadis, Christos Dantis, Natalia Germanou, Eleni Peta, Antonis and Yannis Vardis, Stelios Rokkos, and Sakis Rouvas.

Participation in Eurovision Song Contest
She represented Cyprus in the Eurovision Song Contest in 1992 (Malmö, Sweden) with the song "Teriazoume" (finishing in eleventh place), and then in 1994 (Dublin, Ireland) with Ime Anthropos Ki Ego. The latter caused controversial reactions from critics and the audience due to the song's political allusion to The Cyprus Problem. On the other hand, it became a hot favourite to win because of its ethnic sound and her very sentimental performance. As with her first entry in the contest two years previously, Evridiki took eleventh place. Evridiki also appeared as a backing vocalist in Eurovision on three separate occasions, in 1983, 1986, and 1987.

In 2007, she was selected to represent Cyprus for a third time, in that year's contest, with a French-language song Comme Ci, Comme Ça whose lyrics were written by Posidonas Giannopoulos and its music composed by Dimitris Korgialas. Despite being one of the favourites to win the competition, it failed to make it through the semi-final stage of the competition finishing 15th.

In 2008, she appeared at the Junior Eurovision Song Contest 2008 in which she performed the theme song of the contest, Fun in the Sun with her then husband Dimitris Korgialas.

Discography
Studio albums

 1991 – Gia proti fora (re-issue CD with 3 more tracks)
 1992 – Poso ligo me xeris
 1993 – Misise me (re-issue CD with 2 more tracks)
 1995 – Fthinoporo gynaikas
 1996 – I epomeni mera (double CD with a live recording)
 1997 – Pes to mmou afto
 1998 – Dese mou ta matia
 1999 – To koumbi
 2000 – Ola dika sou
 2002 – Live ki allios
 2003 – Oso fevgo gyrizo
 2005 – Sto idio vagoni
 2007 – 13
 2009 – Etsi einai i agapi (with Dimitris Korgialas)
 2011 – Oneirevomai akoma mama
 2017 – 25 gia panta
EPs
 2010 – ...Etsi apla

Singles
 1992 – "Tairiazoume" ("")
 1994 –  "Eimai anthropos ki ego" ("")
 1996 –  "Afto to fili" ("")
 1997 –  "As en tziai mian foran" ("")
 1997 – "Pes to mou afto" ("")
 2008 – "I Zoi Ehei Hroma" ("")

Promo singles
 1993 – "Misise me" ("")
 1995 – "Fthinoporo ginekas: Fovamai/Ti theleis apo mena" ("")
 2003 – "Piase me" ("")
 2005 – "Sto idio vagoni" ("")
 2005 – "Thelo toso na se do" ("")
 2007 – "Comme ci, comme ça"

As featured artist

 1990 – To Proto Mas Party [LP]
 1990 – Erotika Minimata by Pashalis (Arvanitidis)
 1997 – En Psyhro by Giorgos Alkaios
 1999 – One by One
 2002 – O Vasilias ki Ego
 2003 – Tragoudi sta Pedia (Live) by Giorgos Theofanous
 2003 – Esis i Fili Mou ki Ego by Vassilis Papakonstantinou
 2003 – As' ta Dyskola se Mena by Dimitris Korgialas
 2005 – I Mera Fevgi by Dimitris Korgialas
 2006 – EuroRevisions (compilation) produced by Giorgis Christodoulou
 2006 – I Apli Methodos ton Trion by Imiskoumbria
 2008 – Ta Koutia Ine Koufa by Dimitris Korgialas

Videography

References

External links
www.evridikis.com

1968 births
Living people
Eurovision Song Contest entrants for Cyprus
Cypriot expatriates in Greece
21st-century Cypriot women singers
Cypriot pop singers
Greek Cypriot singers
Eurovision Song Contest entrants of 1992
Eurovision Song Contest entrants of 1994
Eurovision Song Contest entrants of 2007
Minos EMI artists
Modern Greek-language singers
People from Nicosia
Thessaloniki Song Festival entrants
Virus Music artists
Berklee College of Music alumni
20th-century Cypriot women singers